Briar Patch or variants may refer to:

 a thicket formed by thorny plants
 Briar Patch, a place in the fictional Br'er Rabbit stories
 Briar Patch (Star Trek), a fictional region of space 
 "Briar Patch", a 1989 story by Dean Ing in the Man-Kzin Wars series
 "Briarpatch", a song by Devin the Dude from the 2004 album To tha X-Treme 
 The Briar Patch, a 1973 book by Murray Kempton about the trial of the Panther 21
 Briarpatch, a Canadian news magazine
 Briarpatch, a 1984 novel by Ross Thomas
 Briarpatch (TV series), an American TV series based on the novel 
 Briarpatch, a 2011 novel by Tim Pratt